Rheinheimera nanhaiensis is a Gram-negative, rod-shaped, and facultatively aerobic  bacterium from the genus of Rheinheimera which has been isolated from sediments from the South China Sea.

References

External links
Type strain of Rheinheimera nanhaiensis at BacDive -  the Bacterial Diversity Metadatabase

Chromatiales
Bacteria described in 2011